Federico Fernando Higuaín (born 25 October 1984) is an Argentine former professional footballer who played as a forward and attacking midfielder. He is currently the head coach for MLS Next Pro club Inter Miami II.

He played 157 games and scored 35 goals in the Argentine Primera División for River Plate, Nueva Chicago, Independiente, Godoy Cruz and Colón between 2003 and 2012. He also had brief spells in Turkey with Beşiktaş J.K. and Mexico with Club América in 2007–08.

In 2012, he signed for Columbus Crew SC for a club-record US$650,000, and won the MLS Newcomer of the Year Award in his first season. He made nearly 200 appearances and scored over 50 goals for the club, helping them to the Eastern Conference title in 2015.

Early life
Higuaín was born in Buenos Aires, Argentina, the son of the Argentine former footballer Jorge Higuaín. Higuaín has three brothers, Nicolas, Lautaro and Gonzalo, also a footballer.

Club career

Early career
Higuaín signed with River Plate as a youngster, playing 5 games and registering no goals. He soon went on loan to Nueva Chicago in the Argentine second division, where he played 77 total games, scoring 29 goals. He also impressed during stints at Godoy Cruz and Colón de Santa Fe.

In August 2007, Higuaín signed a three-year contract at Beşiktaş J.K. of the Turkish Süper Lig, for a US$1.65 million fee. He did not settle in Istanbul, and the following February he was loaned to Mexico's Club América.

Columbus Crew SC
Higuaín signed for the Columbus Crew as the team's third ever designated player on 27 July 2012, for a then club record fee of $650,000 USD.  He made his debut on 19 August as a substitute against the Houston Dynamo and assisted on the go-ahead goal by Eddie Gaven with a ball over the top 13 minutes later. Three days later he got his first MLS start against Toronto FC, and in the fourth minute again set up a Gaven opener, then scored the winning goal himself. In the next game on 26 August, he scored two goals from free kicks in an eventual 4–3 victory over the New England Revolution. For his performances over his first several matches, Higuaín was named the Major League Soccer Player of the Week for weeks 25 and 26, of the 2012 Major League Soccer season by North American football journalists. He finished the season by scoring both goals of a 2–1 victory against Toronto FC on the final matchday.

To begin the 2013 season, Higuaín scored in a 3–0 opening-day victory over Chivas USA on 2 March.

Following the 2014 Major League Soccer season in which Higuaín tallied a team-leading eleven goals and seven assists, he was signed to a new contract, the most lucrative deal ever given by the Crew. It was reportedly a two-year contract although terms of the deal were officially undisclosed. At the time of signing his new contract, Higuaín had been ranked fifth in the league in goals, first in penalty kick goals, and one of only eight players to score double-digit goals in the previous two seasons since entering the league.

In 2015, Higuaín scored eight goals and provided nine assists during the MLS regular season, while in the playoffs, he won the Eastern Conference Championship with Crew, only to miss out on the MLS Cup Final to Portland, following a 2–1 home defeat. The following season, Higuaín had a disappointing season, scoring only four goals and adding three assists in just 20 appearances, as Crew missed out on the playoffs. While many pundits expected him to leave the next season, as his contract was expiring, he signed a one-year extension, and in 2017, he helped Crew to qualify for the playoffs and reach the Eastern Conference finals.

On 25 May 2019, in a game against the Colorado Rapids, Higuaín was injured, and subsequently received anterior cruciate ligament surgery, ruling him out for the remainder of the season. On 21 October 2019, Columbus Crew's president and general manager, Tim Bezbatchenko, announced that the club decided not to extend his contract for the next season.

D.C. United 
On 2 March 2020, Higuaín joined D.C. United as a player and Player Development Coach. On 13 July 2020, he made his first appearance in an "MLS is Back" tournament match against Toronto FC. With D.C. United losing 2–0 and at a man disadvantage due to a first-half ejection, Higuain came on as a substitute in the 80th minute and scored on a breakaway in the 84th minute. D.C. United added a second goal in injury time to force a 2–2 draw.

Inter Miami CF 
On 10 October 2020, D.C. United traded Higuaín to Inter Miami in exchange for $50,000 in General Allocation Money, where Higuaín joined his brother, Gonzalo Higuaín. Higuaín re-signed with Miami on 28 January 2021 for the 2021 season. Following the 2021 season, Higuaín announced his retirement from playing professional football.

Style of play
Nicknamed Pipa, Higuaín is a diminutive playmaker with a slender physique. While not being a prolific goalscorer, his technique, vision, intelligence, creativity on the ball, ability to provide assists for his teammates, and eye for goal from midfield make him capable of playing both as a forward and as an attacking midfielder, and he has also often functioned as a second striker, or as a winger. Buenos Aires-based journalist Daniel Colasimone has stated that "[h]is role is more to harass opposition defenses with intelligent runs, fine ball control and incisive passing. His hard work on and off the ball, and affable personality made him well-liked wherever he played in Argentina." His coach at Columbus, Gregg Berhalter, said of him in 2015: "He’s the guy who ties everything together. He ties the defense to the offense on both sides of the ball. He's been fantastic this year, and his contribution is underrated in my eyes because he's been performing at a really, really high level."

Coaching
Higuaín began his coaching career in 2020 when he signed with D.C. United as a player & player development coach.

On 4 February 2022, Hugaín was named as part of the coaching staff for Inter Miami II ahead of the inaugural MLS Next Pro season.

Personal life
Higuaín holds a U.S. green card which qualifies him as a domestic player for MLS roster purposes.

Career statistics

Honours
Individual
 MLS Newcomer of the Year: 2012
 MLS Player of the Week 2012: Week 25, 26
 AT&T Goal of the Week 2013: Week 24
 MLS Player of the Week 2014: Week 11

References

External links
 
 
 Argentine Primera statistics at Fútbol XXI 

1984 births
Living people
Argentine people of Basque descent
Footballers from Buenos Aires
Argentine footballers
Association football forwards
Club Atlético River Plate footballers
Nueva Chicago footballers
Beşiktaş J.K. footballers
Club América footballers
Club Atlético Independiente footballers
Club Atlético Colón footballers
Columbus Crew players
Liga MX players
Süper Lig players
Argentine Primera División players
Major League Soccer players
Designated Players (MLS)
Argentine expatriate footballers
Argentine expatriate sportspeople in Turkey
Argentine expatriate sportspeople in Mexico
Argentine expatriate sportspeople in the United States
Expatriate footballers in Mexico
Expatriate footballers in Turkey
Expatriate soccer players in the United States
D.C. United players
Inter Miami CF players
D.C. United non-playing staff
Inter Miami CF non-playing staff
Inter Miami CF II